Michael Mouauri (born 24 April 1974) in the Cook Islands is a footballer who plays as a defender. He currently plays for Nikao Sokattack F.C. in the Cook Islands Round Cup and the Cook Islands national football team.

References

1974 births
Living people
Cook Islands international footballers
Association football defenders
Cook Island footballers

pl:Tuka Tisam